Sidiailles is a commune in the Cher department in the Centre-Val de Loire region of France.

Geography

Population

Sights

 The ruins of a twelfth-century abbey.
 The church of St. Pierre and St. Paul, dating from the twelfth century, with a bell cast in 1235.
 A large reservoir.

See also
Communes of the Cher department

References

External links

Sidiailles website 
Annuaire Mairie website 

Communes of Cher (department)